Benjamin Franklin Finkel (July 5, 1865 – February 5, 1862) was a mathematician and educator most remembered today as the founder of the American Mathematical Monthly journal. Born in Fairfield County, Ohio and educated in small country schools, Finkel received both a BS and MA from Ohio Northern University (1888 and 1891, respectively). In 1888 he copyrighted A Mathematical Solution Book. The purpose of the book was to provide mathematics teachers a text utilizing a systematic method of problem solving, "The Step Method", representing a chain of reasoning, in logical order, to arrive at the correct result. The first edition was postponed until 1893, due to financial problems of the original publisher. The book's preface stated that the work was based upon eight years of teaching in the public schools.  This was followed by following editions in 1897, 1899 and 1902. In 1895 he became professor of mathematics and physics at Drury College. He was a University Scholar in Mathematics at the University of Chicago from 1895–1896. In 1906 he was awarded a doctorate from the University of Pennsylvania, where he had earlier earned an additional master's degree in 1904 and a Harrison fellow appointment in 1905. He was a member of the American Mathematical Society, 1891; the London Mathematical Society, 1898; and Circolo Mathematico di Palermo, 1902. He retained his professorship at Drury College until his death in 1947.

References

External links
Benjamin Finkel 1865-1947 from the Ohio section of the MAA

19th-century American mathematicians
20th-century American mathematicians
Ohio Northern University alumni
1865 births
1947 deaths
The American Mathematical Monthly editors